Lepidochrysops carsoni is a butterfly in the family Lycaenidae. It is found in Zambia.

Both wings are violet blue with a brown termen. The forewings have a brown dash and the hindwings have two largish anal yellow spots. The underside of both wings is dull brownish grey.

References

Butterflies described in 1901
Lepidochrysops
Endemic fauna of Zambia
Butterflies of Africa